Play in Group E of the 1990 FIFA World Cup completed on 21 June 1990. Spain won the group, and advanced to the second round, along with Belgium and Uruguay. South Korea failed to advance.

Standings

Matches
All times local (CEST/UTC+2)

Belgium vs South Korea

Uruguay vs Spain

Belgium vs Uruguay

South Korea vs Spain

Belgium vs Spain

South Korea vs Uruguay

Group E
Group
Belgium at the 1990 FIFA World Cup
South Korea at the 1990 FIFA World Cup
Group